Water tribe or Water tribes may refer to:

People
 Bajau people, an ethnic group of the southern Philippines
 Bhishti, a Muslim community in northern India and Pakistan
 Moken, an Austronesian ethnic group

Fictional tribes
 Water Tribe in the Avatar: The Last Airbender franchise
 Water Tribe in the Bionicle universe
 Water Tribe, a faction in Chouseishin Gransazer

See also
 Sea Gypsies (disambiguation)